John Weldon (19 January 1676 – 7 May 1736) was an English composer.

Life
Born at Chichester in the south of England, he was educated at Eton, where he was a chorister, and later received musical instruction from Henry Purcell. By 1694 Weldon had been appointed organist of New College in Oxford and became well known in the musical life of that city, writing music for masques as well as performing his organist duties.

Some believe he set Shakespeare's play The Tempest to music in 1695, although others attribute that to Henry Purcell.

Weldon moved to London and in 1701 took part in a competition to set Congreve's libretto The Judgement of Paris to music. Perhaps surprisingly, Weldon's setting was chosen over contributions by his older, more experienced and better-known competitors, Daniel Purcell (younger brother of Henry), John Eccles and Godfrey Finger. Even more curiously, Purcell's and Eccles's scores were later published by John Walsh. Weldon's however was not and remains in manuscript, though the lack of recognition of his relatively new name may also have played a part. There is some evidence to suggest that the judges of the competition were not entirely impartial, though it has also been suggested that Weldon's setting was considered less old-fashioned than his somewhat older contemporaries. In the same year as the competition, Weldon was made a Gentleman of the Chapel Royal.

Having established his reputation in London, Weldon continued for some years to write music for the theatre. Music for The Tempest, until the mid-1960s believed to have been composed by Henry Purcell, was in all probability written by Weldon for the Drury Lane Theatre, in 1712. Weldon's musical style owes much to Purcell's influence but is more Italianate and also embraces the 'modern' French styles and forms that were becoming increasingly popular at the time.

John Weldon devoted the latter part of his life almost exclusively to the duties of the Chapel Royal and to writing church music. He succeeded John Blow (1649–1708) as Chapel Royal organist, and in 1715 was made second composer under William Croft (1678–1727). Six solo anthems were published by John Walsh in 1716 under the title Divine Harmony. They were claimed to have been sung by the famous tenor, Richard Elford, though it seems that at least some of the anthems were written for one Mr Bowyer during Weldon's time at New College. Weldon also held the post of organist at two London Churches, St Bride's, Fleet Street (from 1702) and St Martin-in-the-Fields (from 1714). He died on 7 May 1736 and is buried in St. Paul's Church, Covent Garden, London. Some of his sacred music is published by Music 18.

Descendants
John Weldon's grandson Samuel Thomas Champnes would follow in his musical footsteps and become one of Handel's soloists.  Many of their descendants were involved in the church and took the Weldon surname as their second name, often writing the music for hymns in Hymns Ancient and Modern.

Works

Sacred Music
Until the early 21st century, John Weldon's work had been judged primarily on the basis of the six anthems published in Divine Harmony during his lifetime and the two anthems published in Boyce's Cathedral Music. The six solo anthems have much to commend them, but also weaknesses in sequential and (to a lesser degree) tonal control. The seventh, O God, thou hast cast us out is rather more sophisticated and as such gained a place in Arnold's Cathedral Music. Also gaining a place in this collection was the full-with-verse anthem, Who can tell how oft he offendeth. It is this anthem that Weldon excels in a synthesis of Blow/Purcellian structure and Handelian harmony. The most successful of Weldon's writing, though, is found in the verse anthems. In these he conveys a wide range of emotions and develops ensemble writing techniques in systematic ways. Particularly successful are the anthems conveying joy and praise with unbounded elation. The solo and ensemble writing in these verse anthems is particularly strong, with real virtuosity required on the part of the singers.

Anthems in (probable) chronological order:

Operas
The Judgement of Paris (6 May 1701) 
Orpheus and Euridice (c. 1701) 
Britain's Happines (1704) 
The Tempest (1712)

Cultural offices

References

External links

Anthems by John Weldon published by Music 18

English Baroque composers
English classical composers
Gentlemen of the Chapel Royal
People from Chichester
People educated at Eton College
Organists of New College, Oxford
English opera composers
Male opera composers
1676 births
1736 deaths
18th-century classical composers
18th-century British male musicians
18th-century English composers
English male classical composers